Santa María de Grado is one of 28 parishes (administrative divisions) in the municipality of Grado, within the province and autonomous community of Asturias, in northern Spain.

The population is 127 (INE 2007).

Villages and hamlets
Barredo (Barréu)
Castaños
Cima de Grado (Cimagráu)
Corros
Fozante
La Carballeda (La Cabayeda)
La Piedra
Llera

References

Parishes in Grado